Sofronovo is a rural locality (a village) in Danilovskoye Rural Settlement, Melenkovsky District, Vladimir Oblast, Russia. The population was 393 as of 2010. There are 3 streets.

Geography 
Sofronovo is located 20 km northwest of Melenki (the district's administrative centre) by road. Danilovo is the nearest rural locality.

References 

Rural localities in Melenkovsky District
Melenkovsky Uyezd